Pseudosphenoptera boyi is a moth in the subfamily Arctiinae. It is found in Brazil.

References

Natural History Museum Lepidoptera generic names catalog

Arctiinae